Zediker may refer to:
Zediker, California
Zediker, Pennsylvania
Kara Zediker, American actress